Major-General Sir Leopold Charles Louis Oldfield KBE CB CMG DSO (1872–1949) was General Officer Commanding Malaya Command.

Military career
Educated at Clifton College, Oldfield was commissioned into the Royal Artillery as a second lieutenant on 1 April 1892. He was promoted to lieutenant on 1 April 1895, and to captain on 5 April 1900, serving at the time with the 32 Battery Royal Field Artillery stationed at Deesa, British India. In October 1902 he was appointed adjutant of a Volunteer battalion, the 5th Lancashire Volunteer Artillery.

He served in the First World War on the Western Front and was latterly Brigadier General Royal Artillery for 51st (Highland) Division in France. He was briefly acting General Officer Commanding 51st (Highland) Division between 11 March 1918 and 16 March 1918. 

After the War he became Brigadier General Royal Artillery for the British Army of the Rhine moving on to be Chief Instructor in Gunnery at the Royal School of Artillery at Larkhill in 1924. He was General Officer Commanding 47th (2nd London) Division from 1927 and then General Officer Commanding Malaya Command from 1931; he retired in 1934.

He was also Colonel Commandant Royal Artillery from 1938 to 1942.

Family
In 1902 he married Millicent Kate Bredin.

References

|-
 

1872 births
1949 deaths
People educated at Clifton College
Royal Artillery officers
Knights Commander of the Order of the British Empire
Companions of the Order of the Bath
Companions of the Order of St Michael and St George
Companions of the Distinguished Service Order
British Army generals of World War I